Asian Man Records is a DIY record label run by Mike Park in Monte Sereno, California. Park started a record label and began releasing music in 1989 under the name Dill Records, with the Asian Man label established in May 1996.

History
Asian Man Records were distributed by Mordam Records.

Sublabels
In 2011, Park established the Fun Fun Records sublabel, which released children's music. As of 2015, artists on the Fun Fun label included Mike Park, Dan Potthast, Play Date, Kepi Ghoulie, Happy Wags, and Koo Koo Kanga Roo.

Artists
The label specializes in mostly ska and punk. The first proper release by the label was Link 80's 17 Reasons and the label has since gone on to release recordings by punk heavyweights such as Alkaline Trio and Less Than Jake. Other artists released include:

Former

 Ahiro
 AJJ (active with SideOneDummy Records)
 Alkaline Trio (active with Epitaph Records)
 Angelo Moore
 Astropop 3
 Ben Weasel 
 Big D and the Kids Table (active with SideOneDummy Records)
 Blue Meanies (disbanded)
 Bomb The Music Industry! (disbanded)
 Boom Boom Satellites
 The Broadways (disbanded)
 The Bruce Lee Band (disbanded)
 The Chinkees 
 Chris Murray
 Colossal (disbanded)
 Dan Potthast (active with Pentimento Music Company)
 Ee (active with Actually Records)
 Five Iron Frenzy
 Good for Cows
 The Honor System
 Johnny Socko
 Just a Fire
 Joyce Manor (active with Epitaph Records)
 King Apparatus
 Knowledge
 Korea Girl
 Laura Stevenson & The Cans (re-release only)
 The Lawrence Arms (active with Epitaph Records)
 Lemuria
 Less Than Jake (re-releases only)
 Let's Go Bowling
 Link 80

 Little Jeans
 Mealticket
 The Methadones
 MU330
 Noise By Numbers
 No Torso
 O Pioneers!!! 
 Pama International
 The Peacocks
 The Plus Ones
 Polysics
 Potshot (disbanded)
 Pushover
 The Riptides
 Riverdales
 The Rudiments
 Satori
 Screeching Weasel (re-releases only)
 Shinobu
 Skankin' Pickle
 Slapstick
 Slow Gherkin
 Softball
 Squirtgun
 Teen Idols
 Ten in the Swear Jar
 The Toasters
 Toys That Kill
 Tuesday
 WARDOGS

|}

Compilation CDs

References

External links
 official site

 
American independent record labels
Record labels established in 1991
Punk record labels
Ska record labels
1991 establishments in California